Sibiritidae constitutes a family of ceratitid ammonites described in the Treatise, Part L, 1957,  as ribbed or teberculate derivatives of Meekoceritidae with modification of the venter from mere widening and transverse ribbing to sulcation (being grooved).

The Sibiritidae have been removed from the Noritaceae where 8 genera were included to the Ceratitaceae with some 14 genera within three defined subfamilies, as indicated.

Keyserlingitinae   
Goricanites
Olenekoceras
Pseudokeyserlingites
Subolenekites

Olenikitinae   
Kazakhstanites
Olenikites
Prohungarites
Pseudosvalbardiceras
Svalbardiceras
Timoceras
Tjururpites

Silberlingitinae
Silberlingites

References

 Arkell, et al., Mesozoic Ammonoidea, Treatise on Invertebrate Paleontology, Part L, 1957.
 Sibiritidae PbDb 12/07/2013

Ceratitoidea
Ceratitida families
Early Triassic first appearances
Early Triassic extinctions